Chilabothrus chrysogaster, commonly known as the Turks and Caicos Islands boa or the Southern Bahamas boa, is a species of snake found in the Southern Bahamas (Great Inagua, Sheep Cay) and the Turks and Caicos Islands. Local names include the rainbow boa (not to be confused with Epicrates cenchria, the "real" rainbow boa), the Bahamas cat boa, the rainbow snake, and the fowl snake. Like all boids, it is not a venomous species.

Subspecies
Two subspecies are recognized:
Chilabothrus chrysogaster chrysogaster  – Turks and Caicos Islands boa – the Turks and Caicos Islands
Chilabothrus chrysogaster relicquus  – Great Inagua boa – the Bahamas (Great Inagua and Sheep Cay)

A third subspecies, Chilabothrus chrysogaster schwartzi  from the Bahamas (Crooked Island and Acklins), was formerly recognized, but is now elevated to full species status (i.e., Chilabothrus schwartzi).

Nota bene: A trinomial authority in parentheses indicates that the subspecies was originally described in a genus other than Chilabothrus.

Description
Turks and Caicos Islands boas are nocturnal, and actively forage for lizards, birds, and rodents. They prefer either tropical dry forest habitat or scrub vegetation with plenty of large, flat rocks.

There are three color morphs of this species: spotted, striped, and no-pattern. The spotted version seems to be the most common, followed by striped and finally the very uncommon no-pattern snakes, which are mostly solid gray with a few dark markings. Juveniles are orange or red and long and thin. Rarely, some adults will retain the juvenile coloration.

Threats
There are three primary threats to this species:
 Introduced predators: Turks and Caicos Islands boas are extremely vulnerable to predation by cats and rats. Cats can likely decimate or exterminate populations of boas on small islands.
 Human persecution: People are often afraid of snakes and will kill them on site, mistakenly believing that they are venomous, harmful, or demonic entities.
 Habitat loss: The Turks and Caicos Islands are being rapidly developed. Boas must compete with people for habitat and suitable places to live. Because they are very slow moving, snakes are easily killed when trying to cross the roads that run through their habitat. They cannot dodge passing cars, and a road through their habitat can drastically reduce reproductive adults in a population.

Distribution and habitat
In the Bahamas, the Turks and Caicos Islands boa is found on Great Inagua and Sheep Cay. In the Turks and Caicos Islands, it is found on 10 islands, nine of which are on the Caicos Bank. Boas are occasionally still found on Providenciales, though this population has likely been decimated in the last 30 years and is in danger of extirpation. Though originally reported from Grand Turk, the Turks and Caicos Islands boa now appears to be only found on islands on the Caicos Bank and a few of the Turks Cays.

References

Further reading
 (1871). "Eighth Contribution to the Herpetology of Tropical America". Proc. Amer. Philos. Soc. 11 [1870]: 553-559.
 (2007). The New Encyclopedia of Snakes. Princeton, New Jersey: Princeton University Press.
 (1999). Snake Species of the world, A Taxonomic and Geographic Reference, Volume 1. Washington, District of Columbia: Herpetologists’ League. 511 pp.
 
  (2009). "Snakes of the Turks and Caicos Islands". Brochure for the National Environmental Centre, Providenciales.
  (2009). "Turks Island Boa". Reptiles of the Turks and Caicos Islands.

chrysogaster
Snakes of North America
Reptiles of the Bahamas
Fauna of the Turks and Caicos Islands
Reptiles described in 1871
Taxa named by Edward Drinker Cope
Snakes of the Caribbean